This is a list of notable alumni related to the University of Manchester and its predecessors the Victoria University of Manchester and the University of Manchester Institute of Science and Technology. It excludes those who only have an honorary degree.

Fine and applied arts

Architecture 
 Norman Foster, Baron Foster of Thames Bank, British architect, (Pritzker Prize 1999, Stirling Prize 1998, 2004), designed among others the Swiss Re Building, Millennium Bridge, HSBC Hong Kong headquarters building, Commerzbank Tower, Millau Viaduct, Reichstag dome and the (proposed) Tower 2 of the World Trade Center
 Rod Hackney, British architect, past president of Royal Institute of British Architects
 Stephen Hodder, English architect, winner of the RIBA Stirling Prize in 1996
 Edward Hubbard, English architectural historian
 Leslie Martin, leading advocate of the International Style
 Alfred Waterhouse, English architect associated with the Victorian Gothic revival and probably best known for his design for the Natural History Museum in London and the Town Hall in Manchester

Literature

 Louis de Bernières, born 1954. Writer whose novels include The War of Don Emmanuel's Nether Parts (1990), Señor Vivo and the Coca Lord (1991), The Troublesome Offspring of Cardinal Guzman (1992), Captain Corelli's Mandolin (1994) (winner of the Commonwealth Writers Prize for best book) and Red Dog (2001)
 Malcolm Bradbury, PhD, American Studies, 1955-62. Lecturer in English Literature at the university from 1955 to 1958. Academic and author best known for his novel The History Man (1975)
 Anthony Burgess, BA, English Literature, 1937–40. Writer and critic whose novels include the Malayan trilogy, the Enderby cycle, A Clockwork Orange, Nothing Like the Sun, Earthly Powers and The Kingdom of the Wicked. He produced acclaimed critical works on Joyce, Lawrence, Hemingway and Shakespeare, and studies of language and of pornography
 Miguel Esteves Cardoso, Portuguese writer and journalist
 Daniel Ford, American author and journalist
 Alex Garland, born 1970, BA, History of Art. Novelist and script-writer. Author of The Beach (1996), The Tesseract (1998), The Coma (2004) and Sunshine (2007)
 George Gissing, novelist
 Sophie Hannah, award-winning poet and novelist
 A. J. Hartley, Shakespeare professor and novelist
 A.M. Howell, children's writer
 Grevel Lindop, poet, academic and literary critic
 Ruth Manning-Sanders, Welsh poet and author
 Stephen Mitchell, Head of News Programmes, BBC
 Francis Thompson, English poet
 Barry Unsworth, British novelist who is known for novels with historical themes, Booker Prize winner with Sacred Hunger
 Alison Uttley, children's writer

Music
 Edward Barton, songwriter and poet
 Martin Butler, composer
 Members of The Longcut, English rock band who all attended the university
 Sir Peter Maxwell Davies, composer, Master of the Queen's Music
 Paul McCreesh, conductor
 Ed O'Brien, musician in Radiohead
 Mark Radcliffe, DJ on Radio 1 and Radio 2 and musician: Shirehorses and The Family Mahone
 Ed Simmons and Tom Rowlands, musicians, The Chemical Brothers
 Tim Booth, lead singer of James

Science and Engineering
 Alwen M. Evans, tropical entomologist
 Nicholas Thatcher, professor of oncology

References

 
Manchester